Latifa Bint Alaya El Arfaoui (  pronunciation: ; born February 14, 1961), better known as Latifa, is a Tunisian pop singer and former actress who resides in Egypt. She is known for her Egyptian Arabic genre.

Early life
Latifa Bint Alaya El Arfaoui was born in Manouba, Tunisia.

In 1983, shortly after her father died, Latifa and her family took a trip to Egypt to rest and mourn. While there, she met composer Baligh Hamdi, who advised her to move to Egypt to benefit her career. However Latifa wanted to concentrate on her education, and returned to Tunisia to finish her high school final exams. For financial reasons, she was unable to return to Egypt, so attended college in Tunisia, studying Dutch literature for a year and a half. Her family decided to pay for her to go to Egypt, so she quit college in Tunisia and joined the Arab Academy of Music in Egypt, where she completed her bachelor degree. She is preparing for her master's degree.

While at the Academy, she was discovered by composer Mohammed Abdel Wahab, who had heard her on the radio. At the time she was primarily performing long Tarab songs, but soon began a change of direction working with composer Ammar El Sherei and poet Abdulwahab Muhammed, who she met during her first visit to Egypt.

Recording career
Latifa's early albums from 1984 are primarily in an Arab style. The album Mesa Al Jamal ("Evening Of Beauty") made Latifa Bint Alayah Al Arfaoui famous in Egypt. Akthar Min Roohi ("More than My Soul") was released in 1986. Latifa began singing Arab pop songs with music by Ammar El Sherei and lyrics by Abdulwahab Muhammed. The album was successful across the Arab world, with shorter songs and the addition of different influences such as tango music. She recorded a music video for the hit single "Ew'ah Tegheer" ("Don't Be Jealous"). The success of this album allowed Latifa to buy half the shares of her producer's company and studio, La Reine. Since then, she has co-produced all of her albums and music videos.

In 1997, Latifa released the album Al Ghinwa ("The Song"), considered a follow-up to "Akthar Min Roohi" from a previous album. Latifa then began performing a new style of songs called Qasa'ed Fos'ha. Her next album, 1998's Taloomoni Al Donya ("The World Blames Me"), featured Latifa singing lyrics written by the poet Nizar Qabbani.

Latifa returned in 1999 with a hit album, known in the Arab world as Wadeh ("Clear") and internationally as Inchallah ("God willing"). The album was distributed by Universal Music France, and was the first album Latifa had performed in a foreign language. The Franco-Arab song "Inchallah" made the Elle Magazine top 5. "Inchallah" ("God willing"), "Kerehtak" ("I Hated You") and "Wadeh" ("Clear") were popular singles in the Arab World.

The 2002 variety album Desert Roses and Arabian Rhythms II featured Latifa performing an Arab Mawwal in the song "Take Me I'm Yours," and singing a small part in both Arabic and English with Chris Difford and Glenn Tilbrook of the band Squeeze. Latifa won the World Music Award 2004 for best selling artist in the Middle East and North Africa for the album Ma Etrohsh Ba'ed ("Don't go away"), produced in 2003 by Alam El Phan (Mazzica TV). In 2004, Latifa produced an album distributed by Warner Brothers France, Les Plus Belles Chansons De Latifa ("Latifa's Best Songs"). Although the album was mostly a collection of greatest hits, it also featured a brand-new Raï song called "Khalleoni" ("Let Me"), her first attempt at Raï. In November, 2006 Latifa signed another contract with Rotana to distribute her records across the Arab World.

In February 2016, Latifa released her single "Fresh".

Actress

In 2007 she appeared as herself in the seventh episode of Lahazat Harega, the Arabic version of E.R..

Discography

Over the course of her career, Latifa has released more than 20 albums and singles, and more than 70 music videos.

See also

 Ila Tughat al-Alam
 Arabic pop music
 Arabic music
 Raï

References

External links

1961 births
Living people
Rotana Records artists
Tunisian film actresses
Tunisian television actresses
World Music Awards winners
Singers who perform in Classical Arabic
20th-century Tunisian women singers
21st-century Tunisian women singers
Singers who perform in Egyptian Arabic
Universal Music Group artists